Indigenous Peoples' Day is a holiday in the United States that celebrates and honors indigenous American peoples and commemorates their histories and cultures. It is celebrated across the United States on the second Monday in October, and is an official city and state holiday in various localities. It began as a counter-celebration held on the same day as the U.S. federal holiday of Columbus Day, which honors Genovese-born explorer Christopher Columbus. Some people reject celebrating him, saying that he represents "the violent history of the colonization in the Western Hemisphere".

Indigenous Peoples Day was instituted in Berkeley, California, in 1992, to coincide with the 500th anniversary of the arrival of Columbus in the Americas on October 12, 1492. Two years later, Santa Cruz, California, instituted the holiday. Starting in 2014, many other cities and states adopted the holiday. In 2021, Joe Biden formally commemorated the holiday with a presidential proclamation, becoming the first U.S. president to do so.

History

In 1977, the International Conference on Discrimination Against Indigenous Populations in the Americas, sponsored by the United Nations in Geneva, Switzerland, began to discuss replacing Columbus Day in the Americas with a celebration to be known as Indigenous Peoples Day. Similarly, Native American groups staged a sort of protest in Boston instead of Thanksgiving, which has been celebrated there to mark collaboration between Massachusetts colonists and Native Americans in the first years. In July 1990, at the First Continental Conference on 500 Years of Indian Resistance in Quito, Ecuador, representatives of indigenous people throughout the Americas agreed that they would mark 1992, the 500th anniversary of the first of the voyages of Christopher Columbus, as a year to promote "continental unity" and "liberation".

After the conference, attendees from Northern California organized protests against the "Quincentennial Jubilee" that had been organized by the United States Congress for the San Francisco Bay Area on Columbus Day in 1992. It was to include replicas of Columbus's ships sailing under the Golden Gate Bridge and reenacting their "discovery" of America. The delegates formed the Bay Area Indian Alliance and in turn, the "Resistance 500" task force. It promoted the idea that Columbus's "discovery" of inhabited lands and the subsequent European colonization of them had resulted in the genocide of thousands of indigenous peoples because of the decisions which were made by colonial and national governments.

In 1992, the group convinced the city council of Berkeley, California, to declare October 12 as a "Day of Solidarity with Indigenous People" and 1992 as the "Year of Indigenous People". The city implemented related programs in schools, libraries, and museums.  The city symbolically renamed Columbus Day as "Indigenous Peoples Day" beginning in 1992 to protest the historical conquest of North America by Europeans, and to call attention to the losses suffered by the Native American peoples and their cultures through diseases, warfare, massacres, and forced assimilation. Get Lost (Again) Columbus, an opera by a Native American composer, White Cloud Wolfhawk, was produced that day.  Berkeley has celebrated Indigenous Peoples Day ever since.  Beginning in 1993, Berkeley has also held an annual pow wow and festival on Indigenous Peoples Day.

In the years following Berkeley's action, other local governments and institutions have either renamed or canceled Columbus Day, either to celebrate Native American history and cultures, to avoid celebrating Columbus and the European colonization of the Americas, or due to raised controversy over the legacy of Columbus. Several other California cities, including Richmond, Santa Cruz, and Sebastopol, now celebrate Indigenous Peoples Day and encourage people to donate to a neighboring tribe and recognize the trauma and pain indigenous peoples have been subjected to by colonizers.

At least twelve states do not celebrate Columbus Day (Alaska, Hawaii, Iowa, Louisiana, Maine, Michigan, New Mexico, North Carolina, Oregon, South Dakota, Vermont, Wisconsin), as well as  Washington, DC; South Dakota officially celebrates Native American Day instead. Various tribal governments in Oklahoma designate the day as "Native American Day", or have renamed the day after their own tribes. In 2013, the California state legislature considered a bill, AB55, to formally replace Columbus Day with Native American Day but did not pass it. While the California governor has recognized Indigenous Peoples Day, the holiday was eliminated by Governor Arnold Schwarzenegger in the 2008-12 California budget crisis. On August 30, 2017, following similar affirmative votes in Oberlin, Ohio, followed later by Bangor, Maine, in the earlier weeks of the same month, the Los Angeles City Council voted in favor of replacing Columbus Day with Indigenous Peoples Day. On October 10, 2019, just a few days before Columbus Day would be celebrated in Washington, D.C., the D.C. Council voted to temporarily replace Columbus Day with Indigenous Peoples Day. This bill was led by Councilmember David Grosso (I-At Large) and must undergo congressional approval to become permanent.

Other celebrations
Numerous efforts in North America have honored Native American people as part of Columbus Day, or by designating two holidays for the same date. Especially since Native American activism has increased since the 1960s and 1970s, a variety of protests have been staged against celebrating Columbus Day. These have included mock trials of Christopher Columbus in St. Paul, Minnesota, and protests and disruptions of Columbus Day parades in the United States.

Indigenous peoples in other nations have also lobbied to have holidays established to recognize their contributions and history. In South America, for instance, Brazil celebrates "National Indigenous Peoples Day" on April 19.

In Asia, Taiwan designated August 1 as Indigenous Peoples Day in 2016 under the administration of President Tsai Ing-wen, who announced that the government is committed to promoting the rights of Taiwan's indigenous peoples and enhancing public awareness of their culture and history. In the Philippines, the National Commission on Indigenous Peoples, as well as various local indigenous towns, designated October 29, 1987, as Indigenous Peoples Day.

Native American Day

Some states celebrate a separate but similar Native American Day; however, this is observed not on Columbus Day but in September. Those who observe include the states of California and Tennessee. However, as of 2021, the State of California does not actually observe this holiday by closing its government offices, giving its employees paid time off, or encouraging private businesses to do the same in observance. In Washington state it is celebrated the Friday immediately following the fourth Thursday in November.

International Day of the World's Indigenous People 

In 2003, the United Nations declared an International Day of the World's Indigenous People, establishing it on August 9. This international holiday has been celebrated also in various nations.

Indigenous Peoples Day observers 

The following U.S. states celebrate Indigenous Peoples Day instead of or in addition to Columbus Day.

Adopted 1988 

 Hawaii (celebrated as Discoverers' Day)

Adopted 1989 
 South Dakota (celebrated as Native American Day, instead of Columbus Day)

Adopted 2015 
 Alaska (celebrated instead of Columbus Day)

Adopted 2016 
 Minnesota
 Vermont (stopped celebrating Columbus Day in 2019)

Adopted 2018 
Iowa
 North Carolina

Adopted 2019 
California 
District of Columbia (celebrated instead of Columbus Day)
Louisiana
Maine (celebrated instead of Columbus Day)
Michigan
New Mexico (celebrated instead of Columbus Day)
Oklahoma
Wisconsin

Adopted 2020 
 Nebraska
 Virginia

Adopted 2021 
 Oregon
 Texas

Criticism and controversy
Indigenous Peoples' Day has been harshly criticized by conservatives, with the Washington Examiner publishing a column calling for the holiday's end since indigenous peoples attacked and conquered each other's land. Then-President Donald Trump attacked Indigenous Peoples' Day at a campaign rally in Michigan, calling it an example of how "the radical left is eradicating our history".

See also

 Columbus Day
 Indian Day (Brazil)
 Indigenous Resistance Day
 National Indigenous Peoples Day (Canada)
 Native American Day
 Timeline of support for Indigenous Peoples' Day
Native American Indian Heritage Month

Notes

References

External links

 Archives of Indigenous Peoples Day – Historical archives of the origins and development  of Indigenous Peoples Day
 Berkeley's Indigenous Peoples Day – History of the annual celebration, pow wow and Native American market
 Indigenous Peoples Day 2014 – A short documentary on Indigenous Peoples Day 2014
 Article – 20 Years Later – The Origins of Indigenous Peoples Day

1992 establishments in California
Recurring events established in 1992
Public holidays in the United States
Indigenous peoples days
Holidays and observances by scheduling (nth weekday of the month)
April observances
October observances
Monday observances
Public holidays in Suriname
Indigenous rights in the United States